Mount Collie is a mountain in Yoho National Park, located on the western boundary of the Wapta Icefield in Canada. The mountain was named in 1897 by Charles S. Thompson after J. Norman Collie, an accomplished mountaineer and early explorer of the Canadian Rockies.


Geology

Mount Collie is composed of sedimentary rock laid down during the Precambrian to Jurassic periods. Formed in shallow seas, this sedimentary rock was pushed east and over the top of younger rock during the Laramide orogeny.

Climate

Based on the Köppen climate classification, Mount Collie is located in a subarctic climate with cold, snowy winters, and mild summers. Temperatures can drop below −20 °C with wind chill factors below −30 °C.

See also
Geography of British Columbia

References

External links

Three-thousanders of British Columbia
Canadian Rockies